Sweet Munchies is a 2020 South Korean television series starring Jung Il-woo, Kang Ji-young and Lee Hak-joo. It aired on JTBC from May 25 to June 30, 2020.

Synopsis
Park Jin-sung (Jung Il-woo), a chef who works at a late-night snack restaurant, is struggling to find money to pay for his father's medical bills. When Kim Ah-jin (Kang Ji-young), a television assistant director who is one of his regular clients, asks him if he knows a gay chef who could star in her cooking program, he decides to lie about his sexual orientation and gets the part. Both become involved with fashion designer Kang Tae-wan (Lee Hak-joo) who seems to hide a secret of his own.

Cast

Main
 Jung Il-woo as Park Jin-sung, a chef who works at the late-night snack restaurant Bistro.
 Kang Ji-young as Kim Ah-jin, a contractual producer  who is a regular at Jin-sung's restaurant.
 Lee Hak-joo as Kang Tae-wan, a closeted gay fashion designer who starts collaborating with Jin-sung and Ah-jin.

Supporting

CK Channel
 Yang Dae-hyuk as Nam Gyoo-jang, an open recruit producer.
 Kim Soo-jin as Cha Joo-hee, director of the entertainment division.
 Kim Seung-soo as Lee Sang-young, an open recruit producer.
 Park Sung-joon as Noh Jae-soo, a full-time assistant director.
 Gong Min-jeung as Yoo Sung-eun, a freelancer broadcasting scriptwriter.
 Shin Woo-gyeom as Kang Min-soo, a main producer.
 Yang Dae-hyuk as Nam Gyu-jang, a producer.

Family members
 Choi Jae-hyun as Park Jin-woo, Jin-sung's little brother who is gay.
 Oh Man-seok as Park Hyung-soo, Jin-sung and Jin-woo's father.
 Jang Hyun-sung as Kang In-sik, Kang Tae-wan's father.
 Kim Jung-young as Jin-woo, Jin-sung's mother

Original soundtrack

Part 1

Part 2

Part 3

Part 4

Part 5

Part 6

Ratings

Notes

References

External links
  
 
 

JTBC television dramas
Korean-language television shows
2020 South Korean television series debuts
2020 South Korean television series endings
South Korean romantic comedy television series
South Korean cooking television series
South Korean LGBT-related television shows